The Boeing Pelican ULTRA (Ultra Large Transport Aircraft) was a proposed ground effect fixed-wing aircraft under study by Boeing Phantom Works.

Development
The Boeing Pelican ULTRA is intended as a large-capacity transport craft initially for military use, with possible subsequent availability as a commercial freighter serving the world's largest cargo centers.  It is significantly larger and more capable than the biggest existing commercial airliners, commercial freighters, and military airlifters. The Pelican is not targeted for civilian transportation, but it can be converted to a commercial airliner transporting up to 3,000 passengers.

Internal deliberation
In particular, the Department of Defense had requested a vehicle of any mode (land, air, or sea) with the ability to move  of cargo. Knowing that the United States Army was investigating large airships and airship-airplane hybrids, Boeing Phantom Works internally considered and rejected at least three known design iterations: a large blimp or dirigible airship, a smaller but wider airship that creates dynamic lift while in forward motion, and then back to a larger airship that flies at low altitude with wings spanning . It also looked at and discarded a fast oceangoing ship and a sea-based ground effect vehicle.

Boeing Phantom Works then selected a land-based ground effect vehicle with high drooping wings as its solution. It applied for a patent in October 2001 on a ground effect airplane that would form the basis for the Pelican, aside from some eventually omitted design elements such as a T-tail, upward-pointing (positive dihedral) winglets, an additional middle row of landing gears, and a loading ramp at the back of the fuselage.

Initial artist drawings of the aircraft were made public in early 2002. In May 2002, Boeing applied for a patent on variable-sweep, downward-pointing (negative dihedral, or anhedral) winglets to help ground effect vehicles avoid water contact while minimizing aerodynamic drag; the patent drawings show a cylindrical fuselage, which may indicate that a pressurized aircraft was considered at the time, although the final Pelican design has an unpressurized fuselage. The next month, without explicitly naming Boeing as the aircraft originator, the Army cited the Pelican as an emerging technology to improve strategic responsiveness in its 2002 Transformation Roadmap. In July, a U.S. Transportation Command team lead at Scott Air Force Base mentioned the Pelican as a practical solution for moving troops and equipment over long distances.

Public introduction
The Pelican was formally introduced to the public at the 2002 Farnborough International Airshow in July, but with few specifics. As described in its physical form, the aircraft mostly resembled future versions of the Pelican, except that the winglets were reverted to upward-pointing to maximize lift. Both parameters were drastically smaller than the Pelican's eventual final specifications, however, and although Boeing's original patent called for a folding wing, news reports did not mention a folding mechanism, so it was unclear whether the stated wingspan represented an unfoldable, unfolded, or folded width. While Boeing said that the U.S. Army was evaluating the Pelican in war games as a solution to "beat ships across the ocean," and that the company was jointly studying the aircraft with the U.S. Defense Advanced Research Projects Agency (DARPA), it noted that full concept studies would not begin for another 5–8 years, and the aircraft would have to wait for at least 20 years before entering service.

In addition, it stated that the Pelican could move 17 M-1 Abrams tanks, and that the aircraft would be offered along with the C-17 Globemaster III transport, the CH-47 Chinook helicopter, and the Advanced Theater Transport as part of the company's mobility solution for the U.S. armed forces. This article attracted international media coverage, and as Boeing Phantom Works continued to mature the design (including selection of the mid-size vehicle option), additional details about the aircraft began to appear over the next year in newspaper, general science magazine, and aviation industry print publications and research conferences. In November 2002, Boeing also applied for a patent on an automated system for controlling large, multiple-wheel steering aircraft (such as the Pelican) during ground maneuvers, crosswind landings, and crosswind takeoffs.

According to Boeing, the Pelican aircraft technology was starting to gain followers among the decision makers evaluating the mobility initiatives within the Army and the Air Force, and the Navy also showed interest though it was directing its attention more toward hybrid ultra-large airships (HULAs). The market could support over 1,000 of this type of aircraft by 2020, Boeing asserted, if the military used this aircraft and if air transport's share of the transoceanic cargo shipping market increased to two percent from one percent (versus the current 99 percent for ocean shipping transport). Taking some market share from ocean shipping could occur, contended Boeing, because in comparison with traditional air cargo transports, the Pelican is less expensive and offers much more payload volume and weight. Boeing stated that the Pelican's continued development could depend on a positive result in the U.S. Army's Advanced Mobility Concepts Study (AMCS), which would describe the future mobility concepts and capabilities needed by the armed forces in years 2015 to 2020.

By the latter half of 2003, Boeing Phantom Works was showcasing the Pelican on its web site and in technology expositions. The U.S. Army published the AMCS report in December 2003, but the Pelican was not among the list of the eight most promising future mobility platforms for evaluation. Despite this setback, Boeing in 2004 continued low-key educational and evangelical promotion of the aircraft.

Project stoppage
In a 2005 United States congressional report evaluating 11 proposed airlift and sealift platforms for military mobility, the Boeing Pelican was assessed as marginally feasible to enter service in 2016, ranking behind six platforms that were deemed feasible.  The lower grade was due to the tremendous investment required to develop an operational product because of the scale of the aircraft and the use of high-risk technologies, which might prevent the aircraft from achieving technology readiness level (TRL) 5. With this assessment, the report essentially reaffirmed Boeing's previous concerns about its ability to produce the aircraft for service by a 2015 timeframe.

Though Boeing filed a couple of patent applications in mid-2005 relating to cargo container handling and automatic altitude measurement, no other public announcements appear to have been made about the aircraft after the report was issued. By April 2006, a report on Boeing internal documents showed that its long-term aircraft focus was primarily about low-cost and environmentally efficient passenger planes of conventional size, and there was no mention of the Boeing Pelican. Facing diminished odds of a large order from the U.S. armed forces, which collectively represented the aircraft's sole indispensable launch customer, Boeing quietly discontinued further development of the Pelican program.

Design
Like the pelican water bird for which it is named, the concept aircraft can both skim over water and soar to heights above mountain peaks. However, the Pelican is not designed for contact with bodies of water, so although the aircraft cannot take off or land at sea, it can be designed to be lighter and more aerodynamic. During flight, the Pelican exits ground effect to climb a few thousand feet while the surface below the aircraft changes from ocean to solid ground, then enters descent to arrive at an airport like other airplanes. This capability differentiates the aircraft from some previously built ground effect vehicles such as the Caspian Sea Monster, whose relatively narrow  could not produce enough lift to fly the large vehicle out of ground effect.

Flight characteristics
Boeing's ocean wave studies during 2000 revealed that north–south aircraft routes and many east–west routes worked very well in ground effect, with flights at latitude between 30 degrees north and 30 degrees south being very efficient, while polar routes were more challenging. At higher flight levels, the aircraft can attain nearly jet-like speeds in thinner air but consumes fuel faster than in ground effect mode, though the aircraft still performs at a fuel efficiency similar to a Boeing 747-400F aircraft freighter.

The aircraft takes off and lands at airfields differently from conventional airliners because of the Pelican's unusual landing gear configuration. A typical aircraft pitches its nose up right before final liftoff or touchdown, but the Pelican appears to have little or no rotation. Like the Boeing B-52 Stratofortress strategic bomber, the Pelican seems to levitate on or off the ground.

Fuselage
It is capped in front by a large swing-nose door, which allows for loading and unloading cargo through both decks, and in back by conventional tailfin and tailplane stabilizers attached directly to the fuselage, instead of the heavier T-tail empennage that is typically used by other ground effect planes. For military purposes, the upper deck is designed to carry troops or cargo containers, while the main deck has a height of  so that it can hold oversized vehicles such as tanks or helicopters.

Wings

The aircraft's wings are mounted to the fuselage in a high wing configuration, and they are unswept and mostly parallel to the ground in their inner sections. The wings droop downward in their outer sections to enhance ground effect, also having a slight backward sweep in the leading edge and forward sweep in the trailing edge. To let the aircraft change shape for different types of operations, the wings are hinged within the drooping sections, and the axis of rotation is parallel to the fuselage. The wings fold slightly for takeoffs and landings, and they fold about 90 degrees to reduce clearance amounts during taxiing and ground operations. At the ends of the folding wing sections, wingtips droop below the rest of the aircraft by up to  when the larger folding wing and the wingtip are in their normal positions. To avoid ground or water contact, the wingtips are hinged for active rotation, as the rotational axis is perpendicular to the direction of flight but not necessarily parallel to the ground. If a wingtip accidentally touches the ground or water, it minimizes the contact by passively swiveling upward and backward, with the clock position moving from six o'clock to three o'clock or nine o'clock, depending on which side of the wing is viewed.

There are no leading edge devices or anti-icing systems, but the trailing edge has flaps that span the entire wing. The wings are designed with a large thickness-to-chord ratio to reduce aircraft weight and to hold part of the overall payload, a feature that is unique in modern aircraft and only rarely had been implemented in previous-era aircraft, such as in the Junkers G.38.

Power plant

The Pelican is powered by eight turboprop engines, which produce an output of  each. The engines are about five times more powerful than the engines on turboprop or propfan-powered military transport aircraft such as the Airbus A400M (using Europrop TP400 engines) and the Antonov An-22 (Kuznetsov NK-12MA) and An-70 (Progress D-27). The new engines would probably be a hybrid derived from two General Electric (GE) engines: the LM6000 marine engine, an aeroderivative gas turbine based on the CF6-80C2 turbofan (used on the Boeing 767 and other wide-body aircraft) that powers fast ferries, cargo ships, and stationary electrical generation plants, combined with a core based on the GE90 turbofan, which powers the Boeing 777 wide-body twin-engine aircraft. The Pelican's many engines mitigate a single-engine loss scenario, so just as the Boeing 777-300ER can lift its  maximum takeoff weight with just one of its two engines working, seven operational engines out of the eight total can provide enough power for the 7.7-times greater MTOW of the Pelican. The power plant converts about 38 percent of the fuel's energy into thrust, a comparable engine efficiency to those in modern wide-body aircraft.

The engines are paired behind four sets of coaxial contra-rotating propellers that are positioned at the leading edge of the inner sections of the wings. While a single engine drives each set of contra-rotating propellers on some common propfan aircraft such as the An-22 and the Tupolev Tu-95 (respectively the heaviest and fastest turboprop-powered aircraft in the world), the Pelican requires the two propellers within a contra-rotating propeller set to be matched with twin engines. This arrangement is due to the amount of power needed to lift the large aircraft off the ground and to ascend to and cruise at high altitude, but one of the engines in each engine pairing can be turned off while cruising in ground effect, as the paired engines are connected by a geared combiner gearbox so that one or both of the engines can turn the propellers.

Payload
It can carry 17 M-1 Abrams tanks in five rows of three abreast and one row of two abreast. The Pelican can also move ten CH-47D Chinook helicopters, which only use about ten percent of the payload weight capacity and are confined to the main deck due to their vehicle size. While human transportation would typically be in the form of military troops, the aircraft can be used to transport 3,000 passengers as a commercial airliner, though the aircraft is able to ferry the equivalent of 8,000 passengers (including carry-on items, luggage, seats, stowage bins, and other cabin furnishings) if factors other than payload weight are ignored (such as cabin area).

As a cargo freighter, the Pelican is designed to handle the standard intermodal shipping containers used in shipping, rail, and trucking instead of the smaller unit load devices (containers and pallets) that dominate the air cargo industry. The aircraft is designed to handle two layers of containers on its main deck. The containers are arranged longitudinally within the fuselage in eight rows of five containers, followed by two rows of three containers, for a total of 46 containers in a layer. The upper deck only holds one container layer, but it allows access to the cargo area of the wings, each of which can hold 20 containers aligned parallel to the fuselage in two rows of ten abreast.

Range
At the maximum payload, the aircraft can travel  in ground effect, which is about the distance between New York City and London.

Ground accommodation

Unlike the typical tricycle undercarriage of most airliners, the undercarriage arrangement for the Pelican distributes the aircraft's weight on ground over two rows of 19 inline landing gears, which are mounted on each side directly under the length of the fuselage. While only the nose landing gear can be steered on most airliners, each landing gear on the Pelican is steerable, so the aircraft can more easily perform crosswind landings and complete turns at a smaller radius when it is on the ground.

The combined 76 aircraft tires on the Pelican far exceeds the 32 wheels of the current largest cargo aircraft, the Antonov An-225. Pavement loading from the Pelican may be comparatively low, though. Boeing claims that the aircraft's ground flotation characteristic, a measure tied to the ground's ability to keep a vehicle from sinking, at maximum takeoff weight is superior to that of the much-smaller McDonnell-Douglas DC-10, which imposes the most demanding flotation requirements among aircraft of its era. However, according to the designer of the Aerocon Dash 1.6 wingship (a larger, sea-based ground effect vehicle that was investigated by DARPA a few years before the Pelican was proposed), regular Pelican operation at airports with high water tables underground may result in a type of seismic wave that leads to cracks in airport terminal buildings and eventually causes greater damage within months.

A runway with an LCN of 30 can thus withstand the Pelican at lower weights, but it should not host some versions of the narrow-body Boeing 737 (including the popular 737-800) nor most versions of the 777, regardless of whether the runway is long and wide enough to handle those other planes. Boeing maintains that many military airfields are able to host aircraft that have the Pelican's large wingspan, adding that in the conflict regions of Southwest Asia from the Fertile Crescent and the Arabian peninsula eastward to Pakistan, at least 323 airfields meet the satisfactory landing criteria, with additional airfields that can meet the marginal criteria or be restored to satisfactory or marginal. The aircraft's length and wingspan, however, make the Pelican too big for the "80-meter box," the informal name of the maximum size specified in the ICAO Aerodrome Reference Code.

The Pelican requires at the least a ramp or elevator to load and unload cargo. A more ideal setup is to build dedicated ground infrastructure at airports for transloading, such as cranes, railcars, and apron jacks, which approaches the sophistication of container terminal facilities used at the docks of major marine ports.

Specifications

See also

Later Designs
Liberty Lifter

References

Bibliography

External links

 
 
 

Abandoned civil aircraft projects of the United States
Abandoned military projects of the United States
Aircraft with contra-rotating propellers
Pelican
Eight-engined tractor aircraft
Ekranoplans
High-wing aircraft
United States cargo aircraft